The Ministry of Tourism (in French: Ministère du Tourisme) is a Ministry of the Government of Quebec responsible for promoting tourism to the province of Quebec.

The current minister is Caroline Proulx.

External links
 Official website
 Québec Original website (tourism promotion site for the general public)

Tourism
Quebec
Quebec

Tourism in Quebec